The 2014-15 Swiss Challenge League, known for sponsorship reasons as the Brack.ch Challenge League, was the 12th season of the Swiss Challenge League, the second tier in the Swiss football pyramid. It began on 19 July 2014 and was scheduled to end on 30 May 2015. The league was on winter break between 8 December 2014 and 7 February 2015. Servette were forcibly relegated at the end of the season after their failure to acquire a license for the 2015-16 season.

Participating teams

Stadia and locations

Personnel and kits

League table

Results

First and Second Round

Third and Fourth Round

Season statistics

Top scorers

References

External links
 
Soccerway

Swiss Challenge League
2014–15 in Swiss football
Swiss Challenge League seasons